Filipe Ferreira may refer to:

 Filipe Ferreira (footballer, born 1990), Portuguese football defender
 Filipe Ferreira (footballer, born October 1996), Portuguese football midfielder
 Filipe Ferreira (footballer, born September 1996), Portuguese football goalkeeper